Tembey may be,

Tembey language
John Tembey